

Metro Central

Government schools

 Alexander Sinton Secondary School
 Aloe Secondary School
 Athlone Secondary School
 Belgravia Secondary School
 Bridgetown Secondary School
 Camps Bay High School
 Cape Town High School
 Cathkin Secondary School
 Claremont High School
 Crystal Secondary School
 Holy Cross High School
 Gardens Commercial High School
 Good Hope Seminary High School
 Groenvlei Secondary School
 Groote Schuur High School
 Harold Cressy High School
 Heideveld Secondary School
 Ikamvalethu Secondary School
 Immaculata high School 
 Isilimela Secondary School
 Jan van Riebeeck High School
 Kensington Secondary School
 Kulani Secondary School
 Langa Secondary School
 Livingstone High School
 Maitland Secondary School
 Manenberg Secondary School
 Mount View Secondary School
 Ned Doman High School
 Oaklands Secondary School
 Oude Molen Technical High School
 Peak View Secondary School
Pelican Park High School
 Phoenix Secondary School
 Pinelands High School
 Queen's Park High School (Cape Town)
 Rhodes High School
 Rondebosch Boys' High School
 Rustenburg Girls' High School
 Rylands High School
 Salt River Secondary School
 Sans Souci Girls' High School
 Sea Point High School
 Silverstream Secondary School
 South African College High School
 Spes Bona High School
 Thandokhulu Secondary School
 Trafalgar Secondary School
 Vista High School
 Voortrekker High School
 Westerford High School
 Windermere Secondary School
 Windsor High School
 Zonnebloem Nest Senior School

Independent schools

 B.E.S.T College (Salt River)
 Cannons Creek Independent School
 Darul Islam Islamic High School
 Deutsche Internationale Schule Kapstadt
 Diocesan College
 Herschel Girls' School
 Herzlia High School
 Michael Oak Waldorf School
 St. Cyprian's School
 St. George's Grammar School
 Star College Bridgetown
 Star College CapeTown

Metro South

Government schools

 Ikamvalethu Senior Secondary School
 Aloe Secondary School
 I.D Mkize secondary school
 Beacon Hill Secondary School
 Bergvliet High School
 Claremont High School
 Crestway High School 
 Fezeka Secondary school
 Focus College
 Fish Hoek High School 
 Grassdale High School 
 Grassy Park High School 
 Heathfield High School 
 Lavender Hill Secondary School
 Livingston High School 
 Masiphumelele High School
 Mondale High School
 Muizenberg High School 
 Pelican Park High School
 Plumstead High School
 Portland Secondary School
 Sibelius High School 
 South Peninsula High School
 Steenberg Secondary School
 Wittebomme High School 
 Wynberg Boys' High School
 Vuyiseka Secondary School
 Sinethemba Secondary School
 Sophumelela Secondary School
 Phakama High School
 Philippi High School
 Phandulwazi High School
 Oscar Mpeta
 Ntsebenziswano Secondary School
 Wynberg Girls' High School
 Wynberg Secondary School
 Zeekoevlei High School 
 Zwaanswyk High School 
 New Eisleben High School

Independent schools

 American International School of Cape Town

Metro North

Government schools

 Belhar Secondary School
 Bellville High School
 Bosmansdam High School
 D.F. Malan High School
 Durbanville High School
 Fairbairn College
 Fairmont High School
 Milnerton High School
 Range Secondary School
 Sinenjongo High School
 Stellenberg High School
 Table View High School
 The Settlers High School
 Tygerberg High School

Independent schools

 Iqra Academy
 Mountain View Academy
 Parklands College

Metro East

Government schools

 Brackenfell High School
 Chris Hani Secondary School
 Eben Donges High School
 Eersterivier Secondary School
 Hottentots Holland High School
 Monument Park High School
 Parel Vallei High School
 Strand High School

Independent schools

 False Bay High School

Cape Winelands

Government schools

 Bloemhof High School
 Drostdy Technical High School
 Kayamandi Secondary School
 Labori High School
 La Rochelle Girls' High School
 Paarl Gimnasium
 Paarl Boys' High School
 Paul Roos Gymnasium
 Rhenish Girls' High School
 Stellenbosch High School
 Klein Nederburg Secondary School

Independent schools

 Bridge House School

Overberg

Government schools

 De Villiers Graaff High School

 Swartberg Secondary School

 Groenberg Secondary School

Eden & Central Karoo

Government schools

 George Secondary School
 York High School

References
 

 
Western Cape
Schools